Joséphine-Charlotte is a Brussels Metro station on line 1 (prior to 4 April 2009 the eastern branch of line 1B). It opened on 20 January 1976.

The name of the station, like that of the green square adjacent to the entrance, is named after Grand Duchess Joséphine-Charlotte of Luxembourg (born Princess of Belgium). The station is located entirely below the /.

In late 2008, the original Pavimento Pirelli black rubber flooring on the platforms was replaced with new biscuit-coloured terrazzo floor tiles.

External links

Brussels metro stations
Railway stations opened in 1976
Woluwe-Saint-Lambert